Liblice is a municipality and village in Mělník District in the Central Bohemian Region of the Czech Republic. It has about 500 inhabitants.

Geography
It lies mostly in the Jizera Table plateau, the southern part of the municipality extends into the Central Elbe Table.

History
The first written mention of Liblice is from 1254.

Sights
The main sight of Liblice is a Baroque castle built in 1699–1706, designed by Giovanni Battista Alliprandi for Count Arnošt Josef Pachta of Rájov. The chateau serves since 1952 as a conference and recreational facility of Czech Academy of Sciences and was not accessible to the public until 2007. An extensive reconstruction of the castle was completed in 2007, changing the premises into a conference and culturally-educational centre, a castle hotel with restaurants and a relaxing wellness centre.

Notable people
Emil Pollert (1877–1935), opera singer

References

External links

 
Liblice Chateau

Villages in Mělník District